Minister of Finance (Incorporated) (abbrev: MoF (Inc.)) is a body corporate under the name of Minister of Finance based in Malaysia. Established under the Minister of Finance (Incorporation) Act 1957, the Act provides the authority for MoF (Inc.) to enter into contracts, acquisitions, purchases, possessions, holdings and maintains tangible and intangible assets.

See also
1Malaysia Development Berhad
1Malaysia Development Berhad scandal

References

External links
Ministry of Finance Malaysia

 
Government-owned companies of Malaysia
Privately held companies of Malaysia